Some Kind of Wonderful may refer to:

 Some Kind of Wonderful (The Drifters song), a 1961 song made famous by The Drifters.
 "Some Kind of Wonderful" (Soul Brothers Six song), a 1967 song, also covered by Grand Funk Railroad.
 Some Kind of Wonderful, a 1998 song by Canadian band Sky.
 Some Kind of Wonderful, a 2000 song by Reflection Eternal from Train of Thought
 Some Kind of Wonderful, a 2013 song by Eric Kupper, Robina, Clique.
 Some Kind of Wonderful (film), a 1987 film directed by Howard Deutch.

See also 
 SomeKindaWonderful, an American rock band